Bernardo Lino Castro Paes Vasconcelos (born 10 June 1979) is a Portuguese former footballer who played as a striker.

In a professional career which spanned nearly 15 years, he played mostly in Cyprus, representing five teams.

Club career

Portugal / Holland
Born in Lisbon, Vasconcelos played for three teams early in his career, including the reserves of local club S.L. Benfica. In the 2002–03 season he helped F.C. Alverca return to the Primeira Liga after one year of absence, scoring once and appearing in less than half of the league's matches.

In January 2004, after solid performances with S.C.U. Torreense in the third division, Vasconcelos moved to the Netherlands and signed with RKC Waalwijk in the Eredivisie, netting four goals to help the North Brabant side retain their top-level status. Subsequently, he returned to his country with U.D. Leiria, for what would be his only Portuguese top flight experience – after only two matches (36 minutes), he returned to his previous team in the following transfer window.

Cyprus
Vasconcelos left RKC in the summer of 2005, then played one year in Portugal with G.D. Estoril Praia. He then moved to Cyprus and signed for APOP Kinyras FC, scoring at an impressive rate in the division two and adding 12 in 26 games in his first season in the Cypriot First Division, which he split between APOP and AC Omonia.

Vasconcelos returned to APOP for the 2008–09 campaign, helping the team win the domestic cup as he netted in the semi-finals against APOEL FC. Afterwards, he left the club but remained in the Paphos District, signing for AEP Paphos FC.

In the 2010 off-season, Vasconcelos joined Hapoel Be'er Sheva F.C. in Israel, but he returned to former side AEP Paphos in January of the following year. He scored seven goals in only 14 appearances, but they suffered relegation from the top tier.

In June 2011, Vasconcelos signed for Alki Larnaca FC. He was crowned the league's top scorer in his second year at 18 goals, but the team could only rank ninth.

After a stint in Poland with Zawisza Bydgoszcz, Vasconcelos returned to Cyprus in late 2014 by signing a one-and-a-half year contract with Doxa Katokopias FC.

Club statistics

Honours
APOP Kinyras
 Cypriot Cup: 2008–09

References

External links

1979 births
Living people
Footballers from Lisbon
Portuguese footballers
Association football forwards
Primeira Liga players
Liga Portugal 2 players
Segunda Divisão players
S.L. Benfica B players
S.C.U. Torreense players
F.C. Alverca players
U.D. Leiria players
G.D. Estoril Praia players
Clube Oriental de Lisboa players
Eredivisie players
RKC Waalwijk players
Cypriot First Division players
Cypriot Second Division players
APOP Kinyras FC players
AC Omonia players
AEP Paphos FC players
Alki Larnaca FC players
Doxa Katokopias FC players
Israeli Premier League players
Hapoel Be'er Sheva F.C. players
Ekstraklasa players
Zawisza Bydgoszcz players
Portuguese expatriate footballers
Expatriate footballers in the Netherlands
Expatriate footballers in Cyprus
Expatriate footballers in Israel
Expatriate footballers in Poland
Portuguese expatriate sportspeople in the Netherlands
Portuguese expatriate sportspeople in Cyprus
Portuguese expatriate sportspeople in Israel
Portuguese expatriate sportspeople in Poland